Lilyan may refer to:

 Lilyan Chauvin (1925–2008), French-American actress, television host, director, writer and acting teacher
 Lilyan Tashman (1896–1934), American actress
 Lilab, Iran, a village also known as Lilyan

See also
 Lillian (disambiguation)

Feminine given names